The Lockheed Martin F-35 Lightning II is a family of stealth multirole fighters that first entered service with the United States in 2015. The aircraft has been ordered by program partner nations, including the United Kingdom, Italy, Norway, and Australia, and also through the Department of Defense's Foreign Military Sales program, including Japan, South Korea, and Israel. The units that operate or plan on operating the aircraft are listed below.

Operators

F-35A 

 Royal Australian Air Force – 48 delivered out of a 72 planned.
RAAF Base Williamtown, New South Wales
No. 2 OCU
No. 3 Squadron
No. 77 Squadron
RAAF Base Amberley, Queensland
Unspecified possible squadron
RAAF Base Tindal, Northern Territory
No. 75 Squadron (Planned for 2021)

 Belgian Air Component – 34 planned
Florennes Air Base
2nd Tactical Wing
Kleine Brogel Air Base
10th Tactical Wing

 Royal Canadian Air Force - 88 ordered in January 2023. First aircraft to arrive in 2026, first squadron operational in 2029 and full fleet operational by 2032 to 2034.

 Royal Danish Air Force – 27 planned. The first four aircraft are expected to be flown from Luke Air Force Base, starting in 2021 for the training of Danish pilots. The first arrival of the aircraft in Denmark, at Skrydstrup Air Base, is expected in 2023. Full operational capability is expected in 2027.

 Finnish Air Force - 64 F-35A ordered.
Lapland Air Command, Rovaniemi Air Base
Fighter Squadron 11
Karelia Air Command, Rissala Air Base
Fighter Squadron 31

 German Air Force – 35 F-35A ordered.

 Italian Air Force – 9 F-35A operational and 2 more on order with 17 more ordered for delivery up to 2019; up to 60 total planned.
Amendola Air Base, Apulia
32º Stormo
13º Gruppo
Ghedi Air Base, Lombardy
6º Stormo (Planned)

 Japan Air Self-Defense Force – 17 operational; with a total order of 147, including 42 F-35B variants. 38 are being built by Mitsubishi.
Misawa Air Base, Aomori
301st Hikōtai
302nd Hikōtai
501st Hikōtai (Planned for 2021)

 Royal Netherlands Air Force – 28 currently delivered and operational, from 52 ordered
Leeuwarden Air Base, Netherlands
322 Squadron
Volkel Air Base, Netherlands
312 Squadron (Planned for 2023/2024)
313 Squadron

 Royal Norwegian Air Force – 10 operational and used for training of Norwegian pilots in the US, 24 delivered to Norway for testing and integration, with a total of 52 planned In November 2019 Norway declared initial operating capability (IOC) status for its F-35s. FOC is expected in 2025.
Ørland Main Air Station, Trøndelag
331 Skvadron (Planned for 2022)
332 Skvadron

 Polish Air Force – 32 on order. Delivery is expected to start in 2024.

 Republic of Korea Air Force – 24 delivered out of 60 ordered.
17th Fighter Wing - Cheongju AFB
151st Fighter Squadron
152nd Fighter Squadron

 Swiss Air Force – 36 F-35A on order to replace F-5E/F Tiger II and F/A-18C/D Hornet. Deliveries will begin in 2027 and conclude in 2030.

 United States Air Force – 1,763 planned
 Air Combat Command
 53d Wing, ACC – Eglin AFB, Florida
 31st Test and Evaluation Squadron – Edwards AFB, California (53d Test and Evaluation Group)
 422d Test and Evaluation Squadron – Nellis AFB, Nevada (53d Test and Evaluation Group)
 57th Wing ACC – Nellis AFB, Nevada
 6th Weapons Squadron
 65th Aggressor Squadron
 325th Fighter Wing ACC – Tyndall AFB, Florida
 388th Fighter Wing ACC – Hill AFB, Utah
 4th Fighter Squadron
 34th Fighter Squadron
 421st Fighter Squadron
 495th Fighter Group ACC – Shaw AFB, South Carolina
 315th Fighter Squadron (Active Associate) – Burlington ANGB, Vermont
 Air Education and Training Command
 33d Fighter Wing AETC – Eglin AFB, Florida
 58th Fighter Squadron
 60th Fighter Squadron
 56th Fighter Wing AETC – Luke AFB, Arizona
 61st Fighter Squadron
 62d Fighter Squadron
 63d Fighter Squadron
 308th Fighter Squadron
Air Force Reserve Command
419th Fighter Wing – Hill AFB, Utah
 466th Fighter Squadron
Air Force Materiel Command
 412th Test Wing – Edwards AFB, California
 461st Flight Test Squadron
Air National Guard
 115th Fighter Wing – Truax Field ANGB, Wisconsin (Planned for 2023)
 176th Fighter Squadron
 158th Fighter Wing – Burlington ANGB, Vermont
 134th Fighter Squadron
 187th Fighter Wing – Dannelly Field ANGB, Alabama (Planned for 2023)
 100th Fighter Squadron
 Pacific Air Forces
 354th Fighter Wing – Eielson AFB, Alaska
355th Fighter Squadron 
356th Fighter Squadron
 United States Air Forces in Europe
 48th Fighter Wing – RAF Lakenheath, United Kingdom
493rd Fighter Squadron
495th Fighter Squadron

F-35I

 Israeli Air Force – 30 currently delivered, from 50 ordered, and 75 planned.
Nevatim Airbase, Nevatim
140 Squadron
116 Squadron
117 Squadron
Tel Nof Airbase
Flight Test Center - Testbed aircraft

F-35B 

 Italian Air Force – 15 planned
 Italian Navy – 15 planned of which 1 delivered with 4 on order for delivery by 2019.
Gruppo Aerei Imbarcati

Japan Air Self-Defense Force – 42 planned, also planning to deploy to Nyutabaru Air Base.

 Republic of Singapore Air Force – up to 12 planned

 Republic of Korea Navy – unspecified number planned

27 received, with 24 in the UK (one F-35B lost) and the rest in the US, where they are used for testing and training. 42 (24 FOC fighters and 18 training aircraft) to be fast-tracked by 2023. 138 originally planned, amended to between 60 and 80 F-35Bs.
 Royal Air Force
Edwards Air Force Base, California, US
No. 17 Squadron (Operational Evaluation Unit) – 3 operated for testing
RAF Marham, Norfolk, UK – 24 delivered
No. 207 Squadron (Operational Conversion Unit)
No. 617 Squadron
Additional unspecified squadron possible
 Royal Navy
RAF Marham, Norfolk, UK
809 Naval Air Squadron (Planned for April 2023)
Additional unspecified squadron possible

 United States Marine Corps – 340 planned
 Edwards AFB, California
 VMX-1
 MCAS Iwakuni, Japan
 VMFA-121
 VMFA-242
 MCAS Yuma, Arizona
 VMFA-122
 VMFA-211
 VMFA-214
 VMFA-225
 MCAS Beaufort, South Carolina
 VMFAT-501
 MCAS Miramar, California
 VMFAT-502

F-35C 

 United States Marine Corps – 80 planned
 Eglin AFB, Florida
 VFA-101 (Navy squadron that trained both Navy and Marine F-35C pilots, and operated Navy and Marine F-35Cs maintained by both sailors and Marines.) (2013–2019)
 MCAS Miramar, California
 VMFA-314
 United States Navy – 260 planned
 Edwards AFB, California
 VX-9
 NAS Patuxent River, Maryland
 VX-23
 Eglin AFB, Florida
 VFA-101 (2013–2019)
 NAS Lemoore, California
 VFA-97
 VFA-125
 VFA-147

Potential operators

 Royal Thai Air Force – 8 or 12 planned. On 12 January 2022, Thailand's cabinet approved a budget for the first four F-35A, estimated at 13.8 billion baht in FY2023.

 Royal Moroccan Air Force  – It is reported that Morocco in interested in purchasing F-35s to counter Algeria's potential Su-57 acquisition.

Cancelled operators

 Turkish Air Force – 4 F-35A delivered and withheld at Luke Air Force Base. 30 F-35s were ordered, of up to 100 total planned. Future purchases have been banned by the U.S. with contracts canceled by early 2020. Intended Turkish squadrons were:
112th Squadron "Devil"
171st Squadron "Corsair"
172nd Squadron "Hawk"

 United Arab Emirates Air Force – Up to 50 had been planned, although the sale was suspended and reviewed by the Biden Administration. In December 2021 UAE withdrew from the purchase of F-35s as it did not agree to the additional contract terms added by the US.

References

F-035 Lightning II
2000s United States fighter aircraft
Single-engined jet aircraft
Stealth aircraft